The Areare language is spoken by the ꞌAreꞌare people of the southern part of Malaita island, as well as nearby South Malaita Island and the eastern shore of Guadalcanal (the Marau Sound, 60 km away), in the Solomon Islands archipelago. It is spoken by about 18,000 people, making it the second-largest Oceanic language in the Solomons after the Kwara'ae (also spoken on Malaita). The literacy rate for ꞌAreꞌare is somewhere between 30% and 60% for first language speakers, and 25%–50% for second language learners. There are also translated Bible portions into the language from 1957 to 2008. ꞌAreꞌare is just one of seventy-one languages spoken in the Solomon Islands. It is estimated that at least seven dialects of ꞌAreꞌare exist. Some of the known dialects are Are, Aiaisii, Woo, Iꞌiaa, Tarapaina, Mareho and Marau; however, the written resources on the difference between dialects are rare; with no technical written standard. There are only few resources on the vocabulary of the ꞌAreꞌare language. A written standard has yet to be established, the only official document on the language being the ꞌAreꞌare dictionary written by Peter Geerts, which however does not explain pronunciation, sound systems or the grammar of the language.

Language usage and trends 
The ꞌAreꞌare are an ethnically Melanesian people that had up to 18,000 native speakers as of 1999 which was a steep increase from the 9,000 native speakers that were recorded in 1993 by John Houainamo Naitoro. According to census conducted by the Solomon Islands National Statistics Office, the total population of the islands rose from 285,176 in 1986 to 515,870 people in 2009. However, the ꞌAreꞌare language does not encompass the entirety of the Islands. Rather, most of the speaker population is limited to the southern side of the Malaita island as well as the capital Honiara on the island of Guadalcanal.  They are traditionally a religious people and although they are mostly a Christian culture now, the ꞌAre still place a large importance on the connection between ancestors and the land around them. Burial grounds are viewed to be closely related both spiritually and in terms of "ancestral power". The culture of the ꞌAreꞌare people is traditionally passed down orally through myths and other stories, which is why it has been difficult to keep record of all aspects of their beliefs and language. However, steps have been taken by the Wairokai Translation Committee to establish a written standard that can later be implemented into the ꞌAreꞌare school curriculum.

Musical culture 
The ꞌAreꞌare people in the Solomon Islands place a large emphasis on music. In fact, most of the ꞌAreꞌare people recognize at least 20 different musical types. The ꞌAreꞌare refer to musical instruments using the lexeme ꞌau, which has different meaning depending on the context used. At the root level ꞌau means "bamboo" which contrasts with other plants. For example, when one refers to a "tree" the word ꞌai is used. Since the meaning of the lexeme au changes based on context, 'au might also mean "musical instruments (of bamboo)" depending the utilization of that specific product. Since words within the ꞌAreꞌare language have such ambiguity it can often be difficult to translate the meaning completely accurately.

Phonology 
The phoneme inventory of the ꞌAreꞌare language is presented in the table below. Orthographic conventions differing from the IPA notation are given in angled brackets.

The plosives (p, t, k, ʔ) are all voiceless and unaspirated. Besides these, ꞌAreꞌare has two nasals (m, n), one liquid (r), two fricatives (s, h), and one approximant (w). The two fricatives are contrasted in the minimal pair ɾasu 'smoke' vs. ɾahu 'to be old'.

The ꞌAreꞌare language has a five vowel system which uses the letters "i, e, a, u, o". The length of these vowels is contrastive. Long vowels are marked with a macron.

Minimal pairs to show the phonemic status of vowel length are presented below:

 isu 'move' vs. i꞉su 'count, read'
 tete 'pebble' vs. te꞉te 'mother'
 masika 'small' vs. ma꞉sika 'worm'
 oto 'throw, spear' vs. o꞉to 'meet'
 ꞌuta 'what' vs. u꞉tə 'rain'

Grammar Structure

Lexical categories 
Since ꞌAreꞌare lexical categories are not distinguished morphologically, the position of a word in a sentence is necessary to determine their function in a sentence. For example, the noun raeꞌareha 'learned knowledge' is based on the verb root rae-ꞌare 'to be knowledgeable', but the individual components rae  and ꞌare can function as separate lexemes, meaning 'to know' and 'thing', respectively.

Verbs 
Verbs in the ꞌAreꞌare language do not show agreement with the subject and instead of using verbal inflection, preverbal particles are used to express tense. The subject is usually expressed by a noun phrase and independent pronoun which can be followed by a subject markers; which is an independent form and not a verbal prefix.

The following are the three categories that distinguish the difference between verbs:

Strictly intransitive
Strictly transitive
Ambitransitive

Tense 
Research undertaken by Katerina Naitoro has shown that the ꞌAreꞌare language has a basic tense distinction between future and non-future. Tense is used to tie situations to a specific point in time so the following structure is recognized. The future tense is marked in all types of predicates but the non-future is unmarked. Non-verbal clauses can be used in non-future but not in future.

There is also a non-future and future distinction in negation. The non-future is negated with the preverbal particle ma, whereas the particle si is used for future negation. An example of this is used in the phrase Na=ma ma'asu which means "I didn't sleep". But in the phrase Na=si ma'asu, ma is replaced with si which now changes the meaning to "I will not sleep". In addition, active and stative verbal predicates will have the positive future is marked by the preverbal particle ka rao. For example, the phrase Na ma'asu means "I slept". However the similar phrase Na=ka rao ma'asu translates to "I will sleep".

Nouns 
ꞌAreꞌare nouns are not different in structure, so it is common that a word form functions as either a noun or verb. 

Nouns in the ꞌAreꞌare language are divided into the following categories:

 Common and proper nouns
 Count and mass nouns
 Directly and indirectly possessed nouns

In the ꞌAreꞌare language, proper nouns consist of personal names and place names whereas, the common noun subgroup consists of words that refer to locations, buildings and geographical features.

Pronouns 
The ꞌAreꞌare language uses a range of personal, possessive and relative pronouns to reference both inanimate and animate objects. These pronouns are also distinguished by singular, dual, and plural number. The dual and plural pronouns distinguish inclusive and exclusive categories. Inclusive pronouns will include the addressee in the group whereas exclusive pronouns only reference the speaker.

References

External links
ꞌAreꞌare basic lexicon at the Global Lexicostatistical Database.
ꞌAreꞌare language archive at Paradisec.

Southern Malaita languages
Languages of the Solomon Islands